Dosta Dimovska (February 17, 1954 – April 11, 2011) was a Macedonian poet and politician. She graduated Philosophy at Skopje University.

She died on 11 April 2011 after a brief illness.

Career
She was also a deputy president of VMRO-DPMNE from 1991 till 2002.

See also
VMRO-DPMNE

References

VMRO-DPMNE politicians
1954 births
2011 deaths
Deputy Prime Ministers of North Macedonia
Internal affairs ministers of North Macedonia
Female interior ministers
21st-century Macedonian women politicians
21st-century Macedonian politicians